Jewish cuisine refers to the worldwide cooking traditions of the Jewish people. During its evolution over the course of many centuries, it has been shaped by Jewish dietary laws (kashrut), Jewish festivals and holidays, and traditions centred around Shabbat. Jewish cuisine is influenced by the economics, agriculture, and culinary traditions of the many countries where Jewish communities have settled and varies widely throughout the entire world.

The history of Jewish cuisine begins with the cuisine of the ancient Israelites. As the Jewish diaspora grew, different styles of Jewish cooking developed. The distinctive styles in Jewish cuisine vary by each community across the Ashkenazi, Sephardi, and Mizrahi diaspora groupings; there are also notable dishes within the culinary traditions of the stand-alone significant Jewish diaspora communities from Greece, Iran, and Yemen.

Since the establishment of the State of Israel in 1948, and particularly since the late 1970s, a nascent Israeli "fusion cuisine" has developed. Israeli cuisine has adapted a multitude of elements, overlapping techniques and ingredients from the many culinary traditions of the Jewish diaspora.

Using agricultural products from the dishes of one Jewish culinary tradition in the elaboration of dishes of others, as well as incorporating and adapting various other Middle-Eastern dishes from the local non-Jewish population of the Land of Israel (which had not already been introduced via the culinary traditions of Jews which arrived to Israel from the various Arab countries), Israeli Jewish cuisine is both authentically Jewish (and most often kosher) and distinctively local "Israeli", yet thoroughly hybridized from its multicultural diasporas’ Jewish origins.

Influences on Jewish cuisine

Kashrut—Jewish dietary laws

The laws of keeping kosher (kashrut) have influenced Jewish cooking by prescribing what foods are permitted and how food must be prepared. The word kosher is usually translated as "proper".

Certain foods, notably pork, shellfish and almost all insects are forbidden; meat and dairy may not be combined and meat must be ritually slaughtered and salted to remove all traces of blood.

Observant Jews will eat only meat or poultry that is certified kosher. The meat must have been slaughtered by a shochet (ritual slaughterer) in accordance with Jewish law and is entirely drained of blood. Before it is cooked, it is soaked in water for half an hour, then placed on a perforated board, sprinkled with coarse salt (which draws out the blood) and left to sit for one hour. At the end of this time, the salt is washed off and the meat is ready for cooking. 

Today, kosher meats purchased from a butcher or supermarket are usually already koshered as described above and no additional soaking or salting is required.

According to kashrut, meat and poultry may not be combined with dairy products, nor may they touch plates or utensils that have been touched by dairy products. Therefore, Jews who strictly observe kashrut divide their kitchens into different sections for meat and for dairy, with separate ovens, plates and utensils (or as much as is reasonable, given financial and space constraints; there are procedures to kasher utensils that have touched dairy to allow their use for meat).

As a result, butter, milk and cream are not used in preparing dishes made with meat or intended to be served together with meat. Oil, pareve margarine, rendered chicken fat (often called schmaltz in the Ashkenazi tradition), or non-dairy cream substitutes are used instead.

Despite religious prohibitions, some foods not generally considered kosher have made their way into traditional Jewish cuisine; sturgeon, which was consumed by European Jews at least as far back as the 19th century, is one example.

Geographical dispersion

The hearty cuisine of Ashkenazi Jews was based on centuries of living in the cold climate of Central and Eastern Europe, whereas the lighter, "sunnier" cuisine of Sephardi Jews was affected by life in the Mediterranean region.

Each Jewish community has its traditional dishes, often revolving around specialties from their home country. In Spain and Portugal, olives are a common ingredient and many foods are fried in oil. The idea of frying fish in the stereotypically British fish and chips, for example, was introduced to Britain by Sephardic Jewish immigrants. In Germany, stews were popular. The Jews of Netherlands specialized in pickles, herring, butter cakes and bolas (jamrolls). In Poland, Jews made various kinds of stuffed and stewed fish along with matza ball soup or lokshen noodles. In North Africa, Jews ate couscous and tagine.

Thus, a traditional Shabbat meal for Ashkenazi Jews might include stuffed vine leaves, roast beef, pot roast, or chicken, carrots tzimmes and potatoes. A traditional Shabbat meal for Sephardi Jews would focus more on salads, couscous and other Middle-Eastern specialties.

History of Jewish cuisine

Biblical era

The daily diet of the ordinary ancient Israelite was mainly one of bread, cooked grains and legumes. Bread was eaten with every meal. The bread eaten until the end of the Israelite monarchy was mostly made from barley flour. 

During the Second Temple era bread made from wheat flour became predominant. A variety of breads were produced. Probably most common were unleavened flat loaves called ugah or kikkar. Another type was a thin wafer, known as a rakik. A thicker loaf, known as hallah, was made with the best-quality flour, usually for ritual purposes. Bread was sometimes enriched by the addition of flour from legumes (Ezekiel 4:9). 

The Mishna (Hallah 2:2) mentions bread dough made with fruit juice instead of water to sweeten the bread. The Israelites also sometimes added fennel and cumin to bread dough for flavor and dipped their bread in vinegar (Ruth 2:14), olive oil, or sesame oil for extra flavor. 

Vegetables played a smaller, but significant role in the diet. Legumes and vegetables were typically eaten in stews. Stews made of lentils or beans were common and they were cooked with onion, garlic, and leeks for flavor. Fresh legumes were also roasted, or dried and stored for extended periods, then cooked in a soup or a stew. Vegetables were also eaten uncooked with bread. Lentils were the most important of the legumes and were used to make pottages and soups, as well as fried lentil cakes called ashishim.

The Israelites drank goat and sheep's milk when it was available in the spring and summer and ate butter and cheese. They also ate honey, both from bees and date honey. 

Figs and grapes were the fruits most commonly eaten, while dates, pomegranates, almonds, and other fruits and nuts were eaten more occasionally. 

Wine was the most popular beverage and sometimes other fermented beverages were produced. 

Meat, usually goat and mutton, was eaten rarely by most Israelites and reserved for special occasions, such as celebrations, festival meals, or sacrificial feasts. The wealthy ate meat more frequently and had beef, venison, and veal available to them. 

Olives were used primarily for their oil, which was used raw and to cook meat and stews. Game (usually deer and gazelle), birds, eggs, and fish were also eaten, depending on availability. Meat was typically prepared in broths or stews, and sometimes roasted. For long-term storage, meat was smoked, dried, or salted.

Porridge and gruel were made from ground grain, water, salt, and butter. This mixture also formed the basis for cakes, to which oil, called shemen, and fruits were sometimes added before baking.

Most food was eaten fresh and in season. Fruits and vegetables had to be eaten as they ripened and before they spoiled. 

People had to contend with periodic episodes of hunger and famine. Producing enough food required hard and well-timed labor and the climatic conditions resulted in unpredictable harvests and the need to store as much food as possible. Thus, grapes were made into raisins and wine, olives were made into oil, figs, beans and lentils were dried and grains were stored for use throughout the year. 

As fresh milk tended to spoil quickly, the Israelites stored milk in skin containers that caused it to curdle quickly and drank it as thick sour milk which they called laban.

Descriptions of typical Israelite meals appear in the Bible. The Book of Samuel described the rations Abigail brought to David's group: bread loaves, wine, butchered sheep, parched grain, raisins, and fig cakes. The Book of Ruth described a typical light breakfast: bread dipped in vinegar and parched or roasted grain.

The cuisine maintained many consistent traits based on the main products available from the early Israelite period until the Roman period, even though new foods became available during this extended time. For example, rice was introduced during the Persian era. 

During the Hellenistic period, as trade with the Nabateans increased, more spices became available, at least for those who could afford them and more Mediterranean fish were imported into the cities. During the Roman period, sugar cane was introduced.

The symbolic food of the ancient Israelites continued to be important among Jews after the destruction of the Second Temple in 70 CE and the beginning of the Jewish diaspora. 

Bread, wine and olive oil were seen as direct links to the three main crops of ancient Israel—wheat, grapes and olives. In the Bible, this trio is described as representing the divine response to human needs and, particularly, the need for the seasonal rains vital for the successful cultivation of these three crops.. 

The significance of wine, bread and oil is indicated by their incorporation into Jewish religious ritual, with the blessings over wine and bread for Shabbat and holiday meals and at religious ceremonies such as weddings and the lighting of Shabbat and festival lights with olive oil.

Modern Jewish cooking originated in the various communities of the Jewish diaspora, and modern Jewish cuisine bears little resemblance to what the ancient Israelites ate. However, a few dishes that originated in ancient Israel survive to the present day. Notably among them is cholent, or hamin, a stew traditionally eaten on Shabbat that is simmered for 12 hours in a way that conforms with Shabbat restrictions. It dates to at least the Second Temple period. Various diaspora communities created their own variations of the dish based on their local climate and available ingredients, which are eaten today. 

Other foods dating to the ancient Israelites include pastels, or Shabbat meat pies, and charoset, a sweet fruit and nut paste eaten at the Passover Seder.

Talmudic era
Bread was a staple food and as in the Bible, the meal is designated by the simple term "to eat bread", so the rabbinical law ordains that the blessing pronounced upon bread covers everything else except wine and dessert. Bread was made not only from wheat, but also from barley, rice, millet, lentils, etc. 

Many kinds of fruit were eaten. There was a custom to eat apples during Shavuot, while specific fruit and herbs were eaten on holidays and special occasions such as Rosh Hashana. Children received nuts and roasted ears of grain especially on the evening of Passover. Olives were so common that they were used as a measure (zayit).

Meat was eaten only on special occasions, on Shabbat and at feasts. The pious kept fine cattle for Shabbat (Beẓah 16a), but various other kinds of dishes, relishes and spices were also on the table. Deer, also, furnished meat, as did pheasant, chickens and pigeons. 

Fermented fish sauce was an important article of commerce, being called "garum" among the Jews, as among the Greeks and Romans. Pliny says expressly of a "garum castimoniale" (i.e., kosher garum) that it was prepared according to Jewish law. A specific type of locust was eaten. Eggs were so commonly eaten that the quantity of an egg was used as a measure.

The devastation of the Bar-Kokhba revolt greatly reduced the variety of the local diet. In its aftermath, the amount of imported goods declined and vegetables became a luxury. The typical meal consisted of a slice of bread dipped in olive oil, a soup or gruel of legumes, and fruits, especially figs. On Shabbat, a small amount of fish and vegetables were eaten.

While pork was prohibited by Jewish laws as described under kashrut, the refusal to eat pork only became central to Jewish identity while under Roman rule. Pork consumption during the Roman period increased and became closely affiliated with Romans not only as a common cuisine but also as a frequently sacrificed animal. Jordan Rosenblum has argued that by not consuming pork, Jews maintained their sense of particularity and even held a silent revolt against the Roman Empire.

Structure of meal
The first dish was a pickled starter to stimulate the appetite, followed by the main meal, which ended with a dessert, called in Greek θάργημα. Afiḳomen is used in the same sense. Tidbits were eaten before and after the meal (Ber. vi. 6). 

Wine was flavored with myrrh or with honey and pepper, the mixture being called conditum. There was vinegar wine, wine from Amanus and Cilicia, red wine from Saron, Ethiopian wine, and black wine. Certain wines were considered good for the stomach, others not. There was beer from Egypt called zythos (Pes. iii. 1) and beer made from a thorn Spina regia. 

Emphasis was placed on drinking with the meal as eating without drinking (any liquid) causes stomach trouble.

Middle Ages

The Jews were so widely scattered in the Middle Ages that it is difficult to give a connected account of their mode of living as to food. In Arabic countries the author of the Halakhot Gedolot knew some dishes that appear to have been specific Jewish foods, e.g., paspag, which was, perhaps, biscuit.

According to the Siddur Amram, the well-known "ḥaroset" is made in those countries from a mixture of herbs, flour and honey (Arabic,"ḥalikah"). 

Maimonides, in his "Sefer Refu'ot", mentions dishes that are good for health. He recommends bread baked from wheat that is not too new, nor too old, nor too fine, further, the meat of the kid, sheep and chicken and the yolks of eggs. Goats' and cows' milk is good, nor are cheese and butter harmful. Honey is good for old people; fish with solid white flesh meat is wholesome; so also are wine and dried fruits. Fresh fruits, however, are unwholesome, and he does not recommend garlic or onions.

There is detailed information about Italian Jewish cookery in the book Massechet Purim. It discusses pies, chestnuts, turtledoves, pancakes, small tarts, gingerbread, ragouts, venison, roast goose, chicken, stuffed pigeons, ducks, pheasants, partridges, quails, macaroons and salad. These were considered luxuries.

The oppressed medieval Jews enjoyed large meals only on Shabbat, festivals, circumcisions and weddings. For example, the Jews of Rhodes, according to a letter of Ovadiah Bartinura, 1488, lived on herbs and vegetables only, never tasting meat or wine. In Egypt, however, meat, fish and cheese were obtainable, in Gaza, grapes, fruit and wine. Cold dishes are still relished in the East. Generally, only one dish was eaten, with fresh bread daily.

Some Jewish dishes frequently mentioned in Yiddish literature from the 12th century onward are brätzel, lokshen, pasteten, fladen, beleg. 

Barscht or borscht is a Ukrainian beet soup, best known are the berkes or barches (challah) eaten on Shabbat, and shalet (cholent), which Heine commemorates, and which the Spanish Jews called ani (hamin). Shabbat pudding, kigl or kugel in Yiddish, is also well known.

Modern era

In the United States, in particular, Jewish cooking (and the cookbooks that recorded and guided it) evolved in ways that illuminate changes in the role of Jewish women and the Jewish home. 

Jewish cuisine has also played a big part in shaping the restaurant scene in the West, in particular in the UK and US. Israeli cuisine in particular has become a leading food trend in the UK, with many Israeli restaurants now opening up sister restaurants in London and beyond.

In the 1930s there were four Jewish bakeries in Minneapolis within a few blocks of each other baking bagels and other fresh breads. Jewish families purchased challah loaves for their Sabbath meal at one North Side bakery. There were two kosher meat markets and four Jewish delicatessens, one of which began distribution for what would become Sara Lee frozen cheesecakes. The delis sold sandwiches like corned beef and salami.

In Chicago Jewish immigrants from eastern Europe ate a type of oatmeal cereal called krupnik that sometimes had barley, potatoes and fat added, and milk when it was available. Orthodox Jews continued to observe kashrut. Sweatshop laborers carried bagels, knish and herring to work.

Jewish cuisine variations

Jewish cuisines vary widely depending on their regions of origin, but they tend to be broadly categorized into Sephardi (Iberian and North African), Mizrahi (Middle Eastern and Central Asian) and Ashkenazi (Eastern and Central European) families. 

Still, there is significant overlap between the different cuisines, as Jews have often migrated great distances and as different regions where Jews have settled (e.g. Southeastern Europe) have been influenced by different cultures over time. For example, Balkan Jewish cuisine contains both Ashkenazi/European and Sephardic-Turkish influences, as this part of Europe (up to the borders of present-day Austria and Poland) was for a time part of the Ottoman Empire. 

Since the rise of Ashkenazi Jewish migration to 19th-century Palestine and the establishment of the State of Israel, increased contact between Ashkenazi, Sephardi and Mizrahi Jews has led to a rising importance of Middle-Eastern and Mediterranean cuisine amongst Jews of all ethnicities.

Ashkenazi

While Ashkenazi cuisine as it is known today is largely based within the context of American-Jewish and Ashkenazi-Israeli food, much of the culinary tradition of Ashkenazi Jews springs from Central and Eastern Europe, and a good part of that from China. Jordan Paper writes:-
For many Americans, Baltic and Eastern European food is the epitome of Jewish cuisine, although any ordinary restaurant in Poland, the Ukraine, or northwestern Russia, aside from offering pork and mixing meat and dairy, would by that criterion be Jewish. Some of these foods have become part of festival rituals, such as latkes (potato pancakes) during Hanukkah. But unless the Maccabees were in Peru nearly two thousand years before the Spanish arrived, latkes are a relatively recent northeastern European addition to the festivities. The influence of modern Israel on contemporary North American Jewish consciousness has meant that the typical foods of the southern and eastern Mediterranean shores are now also considered Jewish. By that logic, the cuisine of central China should be understood as Jewish also... Actually many so-called Ashkenazi Jewish dishes – such as knishes (Chinese: baozi), kreplach (hundun), blintzes (chunjuian), piroshki (zhengjaio), and many noodle preparations-are northern Chinese. They were brought to Poland and the Ukraine in the thirteenth century by the invading Mongol army, which had chefs, as well as military technicians, from northern China.'  

After having been expelled from Western Europe in the Middle Ages, Jews were forced to live in poverty and thus were limited in terms of ingredients. Dishes were made with fewer components; they were not heavily spiced and ingredients that were more flavorful had to be used sparingly. This is often why some dishes in Ashkenazic cuisine are known for being blander than dishes in Sephardic or Mizrahi cuisine.

The cuisine is based largely on ingredients that were affordable for the historically poor Ashkenazi Jewish communities of Europe, often composed of ingredients that were readily available in Europe and affordable and which were perceived to be less desirable and rarely used by their gentile neighbors, such as brisket, chicken liver, and artichokes, among other ingredients. 

As Ashkenazi Jews were typically forbidden to grow crops in their home countries in Europe, their cuisine reflects that and there are less vegetable-focused dishes in their cuisine compared to their Sephardi and Mizrahi counterparts. 

Meat is ritually slaughtered in the shechita process, and is soaked and salted. Meat dishes are a prominent feature of Shabbat, festival, and celebratory meals. Braised meats such as brisket feature heavily, as do root vegetables such as potatoes, carrots, and parsnips which are used in such dishes as latkes, matzo ball soup, and tzimmes. 

Cooked, stuffed and baked vegetables such as stuffed cabbage are central to the cuisine. Due to the lack of availability of olive oil and other fats traditionally used in Jewish cooking, fat from leftover chicken and goose skins (gribenes) called schmaltz is traditionally used in fleishig (meat) dishes, while butter is traditionally used in milchig (dairy) dishes.

Fish

With kosher meat not always available, fish became an important staple of the Jewish diet. In Eastern Europe it was sometimes especially reserved for Shabbat. As fish is not considered meat by the culinary definition nor in the Judaic context, it is consumed by many observant Jews who consider to be permissible to eat fish with milk and other dairy products. However, within various Jewish communities there are different rules regarding fish and dairy. For instance, many Sephardim do not mix fish with milk or any other kind of dairy product. Similarly, the Chabad-Hasidic custom is not to consume fish together with specifically milk; however, it is permissible to eat fish and other dairy products (ex; butter, cheese, cream) at the same time.

Even though fish is parve, when they are served at the same meal, Orthodox Jews will eat them during separate courses and wash (or replace) the dishes in between. Gefilte fish and lox are popular in Ashkenazi cuisine.

Though the combination of dairy and fish is generally acceptable, fish is the only parve food that the Talmud places restrictions on when it is being baked/eaten alongside meat. Talmudic reasoning for not eating meat and fish together originates from health and sanitary concerns rather than holy obligations. Unlike with milk and meat, it is kosher to eat fish and meat at the same meal as long as; they're baked separately, they're served on separate plates as separate courses, the same utensils aren't shared, and between courses the mouth is thoroughly cleansed with a beverage & the palate is neutralized with a different food.

Gefilte fish (from Yiddish געפֿילטע פֿיש gefilte fish, "stuffed fish") was traditionally made by skinning the fish steaks, usually German carp, de-boning the flesh, mincing it and sometimes mixing with finely chopped browned onions (3:1), eggs, salt or pepper and vegetable oil. The fish skin and head were then stuffed with the mixture and poached. The religious reason for a boneless fish dish for the Sabbath is the prohibition of separating bones from food while eating [the prohibition of  borer, separating]

A more common commercially packaged product found today is the "Polish" gefilte fish patties or balls, similar to quenelles, where sugar is added to the broth, resulting in a slightly sweet taste. Strictly speaking they are the fish filling, rather than the complete filled fish. This method of serving evolved from the tradition of removing the stuffing from the skin, rather than portioning the entire fish into slices before serving.

While traditionally made with carp or whitefish and sometimes pike, gefilte fish may also be made from any large fish: cod, haddock, or hake in the United Kingdom.

The combination of smoked salmon, or whitefish with bagels and cream cheese is a traditional breakfast or brunch in American Jewish cuisine, made famous at New York City delicatessens.

Vorschmack or gehakte hering (chopped herring), a popular appetizer on Shabbat, is made by chopping skinned, boned herrings with hard-boiled eggs, sometimes onions, apples, sugar or pepper and a dash of vinegar.

Soups

A number of soups are characteristically Ashkenazi, one of the most common of which is chicken soup traditionally served on Shabbat, holidays and special occasions. 

The soup may be served with noodles (lokshen in Yiddish). It is often served with shkedei marak (lit. "soup almonds", croutons popular in Israel), called mandlen or mandlach in Yiddish. Other popular ingredients are kreplach (dumplings) and matza balls (kneidlach) – a mixture of matza meal, eggs, water, and pepper or salt. Some reserve kneidlach for Passover and kreplach for other special occasions.

In the preparation of a number of soups, neither meat nor fat is used. Such soups formed the food of the poor classes. An expression among Jews of Eastern Europe, soup mit nisht (soup with nothing), owes its origin to soups of this kind. 

Soups such as borsht were considered a staple in Russia. Soups like krupnik were made of barley, potatoes and fat. This was the staple food of the poor students of the yeshivot; in richer families, meat was added to this soup.

At weddings, "golden" chicken soup was often served. The reason for its name is probably the yellow circles of molten chicken fat floating on its surface. Today, chicken soup is widely referred to (not just among Jews) in jest as "Jewish penicillin", and hailed as a cure for the common cold.

There are a number of sour soups in the borscht category. One is kraut or cabbage borscht, made by cooking together cabbage, meat, bones, onions, raisins, sour salt (citric acid), sugar and sometimes tomatoes. 

Beet borsht is served hot or cold. In the cold version, a beaten egg yolk may be added before serving and each bowl topped with a dollop of sour cream. This last process is called farweissen (to make white).

Bread and cake

The dough of challah (called barkhes in Western Yiddish) is often shaped into forms having symbolical meanings; thus on Rosh Hashanah rings and coins are imitated, indicating "May the new year be as round and complete as these"; for Hosha'na Rabbah, bread is baked in the form of a key, meaning "May the door of heaven open to admit our prayers." Challah bread is most commonly braided or made in round roll shapes. 

The hamentash, a triangular cookie or turnover filled with fruit preserves (lekvar) or honey and black poppy seed paste, is eaten on the Feast of Purim. It is said to be shaped like the ears of Haman the tyrant. The mohn kihel is a circular or rectangular wafer sprinkled with poppy seed. Pirushkes, or turnovers, are little cakes fried in honey or dipped in molasses after they are baked. Strudel is served for dessert. Kugels are prepared from rice, noodles or mashed potatoes.

In Eastern Europe, the Jews baked black (proster, or "ordinary") bread, white bread and challah. The most common form is the twist (koilitch or kidke from the Romanian word încolăci which means "to twist"). The koilitch is oval in form and about one and a half feet in length. On special occasions, such as weddings, the koilitch is increased to a length of about two and a half feet. 

The bagel, which originated in Poland, is a popular Ashkenazi food and became widespread in the United States.

Meat and fats
Gebratenes (roasted meat), chopped meat and essig-fleisch (vinegar meat) are favorite meat recipes. The essig or, as it is sometimes called, honig or sauerbraten, is made by adding to meat which has been partially roasted with some sugar, bay leaves, pepper, raisins, salt and a little vinegar. Knish is a snack food consisting of a meat or potato filling covered with dough that is either baked or grilled.

A popular dish among Ashkenazim, as amongst most Eastern-Europeans, is pierogi (which are related to but distinct from kreplach), often filled with minced beef. Kishka is a popular Ashkenazi dish traditionally made of stuffing of flour or matza meal, schmaltz and spices.

The rendered fat of chickens, known as schmaltz, is sometimes kept in readiness for cooking use when needed. Gribenes or "scraps", also called griven, the cracklings left from the rendering process were one of the favorite foods in Eastern Europe. Schmaltz is eaten spread on bread.

A spread of chopped liver, prepared with onions and often including gribenes, is a popular appetizer, side dish, or snack, especially among Jews on the eastern coast of North America. It is usually served with rye bread or crackers. Brisket is also a popular Ashkenazi dish of braised beef brisket.

Holishkes, stuffed cabbage, also known as the cabbage roll, is also a European Jewish dish that emerged from more impoverished times for Jews. Because having a live cow was more valuable than to eat meat in the Middle Ages, Jews used fillers such as breadcrumbs and vegetables to mix with ground beef. This gave the effect of more meat being stuffed into the cabbage leaves.

Sweets and confections

Teiglach, traditionally served on Rosh Hashanah, the Jewish New Year, consists of little balls of dough (about the size of a marble) drenched in a honey syrup. Ingberlach are ginger candies shaped into small sticks or rectangles.

In Europe, jellies and preserves made from fruit juice were used as pastry filling or served with tea. Among the poor, jelly was reserved for invalids, hence the practice of reciting the Yiddish saying  (May we not have occasion to use it) before storing it away.

Flodni, a layered sweet pastry consisting of apples, walnuts, currants and poppy seeds, were a staple of Hungarian Jewish bakeries prior to World War II.

Because it was easy to prepare, made from inexpensive ingredients and contained no dairy products, compote became a staple dessert in Jewish households throughout Europe and was considered part of Jewish cuisine.

Side dishes

Tzimmes consists generally of cooked vegetables or fruits, sometimes with meat added. The most popular vegetable is the carrot (mehren tzimmes), which is sliced. Turnips were also used for tzimmes, particularly in Lithuania. In southern Russia, Galicia and Romania tzimmes was made of pears, apples, figs, prunes or plums (floymn tzimmes).

Kreplach, similar to Russian pelmeni, are ravioli-like dumplings made from flour and eggs mixed into a dough, rolled into sheets, cut into squares and then filled with finely chopped, seasoned meat or cheese. They are most often served in soup, but may be fried. Kreplech are eaten on various holidays, among them Purim and Hosha'na Rabbah.

Sephardi, Mizrahi and Italian Jewish cuisine

 
The exact distinction between traditional Sephardic and Mizrahi cuisines can be difficult to make, due to the intermingling of the Sephardi diaspora and the Mizrahi Jews who they came in contact with. 

As a general rule, however, both types reflect the food of the local non-Jewish population that each group lived amongst. The need to preserve kashrut does lead to a few significant changes (most notably, the use of olive oil instead of animal fat is often considered to be a legacy of Jewish residency in an area, due to the fact that olive oil may be eaten with milk, unlike animal fat). 

Despite this, Sephardic and Ashkenazic concepts of kosher differ; perhaps the most notable difference being that rice, a major staple of the Sephardic diet, is considered kosher for Passover among Sephardim but it is forbidden as kitniyot by most Ashkenazim.

Sephardi cuisine emphasizes salads, stuffed vegetables and vine leaves, olive oil, lentils, fresh and dried fruits, herbs and nuts, and chickpeas. Meat dishes often make use of lamb or ground beef. Fresh lemon juice is added to many soups and sauces. 

Many meat and rice dishes incorporate dried fruits such as apricots, prunes and raisins. Pine nuts are used as a garnish. Mizrahi cuisine is based largely on fresh ingredients, as marketing was done in the local souq. 

Meat is ritually slaughtered in the shechita process, and is soaked and salted. Meat dishes are a prominent feature of Shabbat, festival, and celebratory meals. 

Cooked, stuffed and baked vegetables are central to the cuisine, as are various kinds of beans, chickpeas, lentils and burghul (cracked wheat). Rice takes the place of potatoes. 

Coming from the Mediterranean and "sunny" climes, Mizrahi cuisine is often light, with an emphasis on salads, stuffed vegetables and vine leaves, olive oil, lentils, fresh and dried fruits, herbs and nuts, and chickpeas. Meat dishes often make use of lamb or ground beef. Fresh lemon juice is added to many soups and sauces. 

Many meat and rice dishes incorporate dried fruits such as apricots, prunes and raisins. Pine nuts are used as a garnish. Pomegranate juice is a staple of Persian Jewish cooking. Kubbeh, a meat-stuffed bulgur dumpling, features in the cooking of many Mizrahi communities. It is served in the cooking broth, as a kind of soup.

Sephardic cuisine in particular is known for its considerable use of vegetables unavailable to the Ashkenazim of Europe, including spinach, artichokes, pine nuts and (in more modern times) squash. 

The cooking style is largely Middle Eastern, with significant admixtures of Spanish, Italian and North African flavors. The most popular Sephardic and Mizrahi dishes include malawach, jachnun, sabich, mofletta, meorav yerushalmi, kubaneh, skhug and amba. Mizrahi Jewish cuisine has many unique dishes that were eaten by Jews in Iraq, Eastern Turkey, Kurdistan, Iran and Yemen.

Shabbat and holiday dishes

Shabbat

Good food is an important part of the mitzvah of oneg Shabbat ("enjoying Shabbat"), hence much of Jewish cuisine revolves around Shabbat.

As observant Jews do not cook on Shabbat, various techniques were developed to provide for a hot meal on Shabbat day. 

One such dish is cholent or chamin, a slow-cooked meat stew with many variations. The ingredients are placed in a pot and put up to boil before lighting the candles on Friday evening. Then the pot is placed on a hotplate, traditional blech (thin tin sheet used to cover the flames and on which the pot is placed), or in a slow oven and left to simmer until the following day. 

Cholent emerged in ancient Judea, possibly as far back as the Second Temple period. Over the centuries, as Jewish diaspora communities developed, they created variations of the dish based on the local climate and available ingredients.

A prominent feature of Shabbat cookery is the preparation of twists of bread, known as challot or (in southern Germany, Austria and Hungary) "barches". They are often covered with seeds to represent manna, which fell in a double portion on the sixth day.

Another Shabbat dish is calf's foot jelly, called p'tsha or šaltiena in Lithuania and galarita, galer, galleh, or fisnoge in Poland. Beef or calf bones are put up to boil with water, seasonings, garlic and onions for a long time. It is then allowed to cool. The broth then jells into a semi-solid mass, which is served in cubes. 

Drelies, a similar dish originating in south Russia and Galicia is mixed with soft-boiled eggs and vinegar when removed from the oven and served hot. In Romania it is called piftie, in Serbia pihtije; it is served cold, with garlic, hard-boiled eggs and vinegar sauce or mustard creme and considered a traditional dish in the winter season.

Kugel is another Shabbat favorite, particularly lokshen kugel, a sweet baked noodle pudding, often with raisins and spices. Non-sweet kugels may be made of potatoes, carrots or a combination of vegetables.

Traditional noodles—lokshen—are made from a dough of flour and eggs rolled into sheets and then cut into long strips. If the dough is cut into small squares, it becomes farfel. Both lokshen and farfel are usually boiled and served with soup.

Rosh Hashanah
On Rosh Hashanah, the Jewish New Year, several symbolic foods called  are prepared and eaten for a variety of different reasons, each unique to the dish. All of the ingredients within the dishes are kosher, which means they follow the laws of kashrut, the Hebrew word for correct.

The majority of the dishes are sweetened to represent a prayer for a sweet (pleasant) new year. Such sweet dishes include apples that are either baked or covered in honey, lekach (honey cake) and makroudh (a pastry that is filled with dates and covered with honey).

Dates, symbolizing the end, can also be eaten by themselves to encourage the enemies to meet their end. The value of the date can be traced back to biblical times, when the palm date is mentioned multiple times within the Bible itself, but also with how valuable dates were as an export.

Pomegranate seeds are eaten for a year of many blessings, because there are many seeds inside of a single pomegranate. Specifically, there are thought to be 613 seeds inside of a pomegranate, each one representing one of the Torah's 613 commandments. 

The traditional value placed on pomegranates and their consumption is derived from their mention in the Bible when its discovery by one of Moses's spies concluded that there was fertility in the land of the unknown.

Challah bread is baked into a round, circular shape that is meant to represent the cyclical nature of life and the crown. It is also sweetened with either honey or a combination of cinnamon and sugar instead of being dipped into the usual kosher salt.

Tzimmes, a side dish composed traditionally of sweetened carrots or yams, are served to symbolize prosperity, because of the double meaning of Yiddish word meren, which represents "to multiply" and "carrot".

Additional symbolic foods include:

Teiglach, knotted pastries boiled in a honeyed syrup (for Ashkenazi Jews).
Head of a fish or a ram, for a successful year in which we are the "head", not the "tail" (because Rosh Hashanah begins the year, it is referred to as the head).
Fried leek cutlets, called karteh (for Sephardic Jews).
Fried chard cutlets, called salkeh (for Sephardic Jews).
Local type of zucchini called qara'a, made into sweet confiture (for Sephardic Jews).
 Algerian Jews serve a honey-dipped date pastry called makroudh.

Yom Kippur
Yom Kippur is a fast day. The pre-fast meal, called seuda hamafseket, usually consists of foods that are digested slowly and are not highly spiced, to make fasting easier and prevent thirst.

Sukkot

On Sukkot meals are eaten outside in the sukkah, a thatched hut built specially for the holiday. Often fresh fruits are eaten also, which are woven into the roof of the thatched hut.

Hanukkah

It is customary to eat foods fried in oil to celebrate Hanukkah. Eating dairy products was a custom in medieval times.
Latkes—potato pancakes, may be topped with sour cream or applesauce  (Ashkenazi food)
Sufganiyot—jam doughnuts (Ashkenazi, popular in Israel)
Fried doughnuts with grounded sugar sprinkled on top, called sfinge (mainly by North African Jews) or zalabiyeh.
Rugelach—filled pastry.

Purim

Hamantaschen—triangular pastries traditionally filled with poppy seeds or prunes
Couscous—a Berber dish of small steamed balls of crushed durum wheat semolina traditionally served with a stew spooned on top
Fazuelos—Sephardic pastries of thin fried dough
Ma'amoul—shortbread pastries filled with dates or nuts

Passover
Passover celebrates The Exodus from Egypt where it is said the Jewish people left so quickly, there was no time for their bread to rise. Commemorating this event, Jews eat matza and abstain from bread, cakes and other foods made with yeast and leavening agents. In modern times, rabbinical authorities permit the use of chemical leavening, such as baking powder. 

Matza is a staple food during the holiday and used as an ingredient of many Passover dishes. Kneidlach (matza ball) soup is traditional. Fish is coated with matza meal before frying and cakes and puddings are made with potato starch and matza meal. 

Jewish cooks use both matza meal and potato starch for pastries during Passover. Whisked whole eggs or egg whites are frequently used to make pastries without leavening agents, such as angel and sponge cakes (potato starch replacing cake flour) and coconut and almond macaroons.

Passover foods vary distinctly between Sephardic and Ashkenazic communities. Ashkenazim exclude rice, while it is served by Sephardim. Matza is traditionally prepared from water and flour only, but there are other varieties, such as egg matza, which may also contain fruit juice. 

At the seder, it is customary in some communities, particularly among strictly Orthodox Jews, to use handmade , which has undergone particularly strict kashrut supervision.

The exclusion of leaven from the home has forced Jewish cooks to be creative, producing a wide variety of Passover dishes that use matza meal and potato as thickeners. Potato flour is largely used in cakes along with finely ground matza meal and nuts.

Popular Ashkenazi dishes are matza brei (crumbled matza with grated onion, fried with scrambled egg), matza latkes (pancakes) and chremslach (also called crimsel or gresjelies, matza meal fritters). Wined matza kugels (pudding) have been introduced into modern Jewish cooking. 

For thickening soups and sauces at Passover fine matza meal or potato flour is used instead of flour, for frying fish or cutlets a coating of matza meal and egg, and for stuffing potatoes instead of soaked bread.

"Noodles" may be made by making pancakes with beaten eggs and matza meal which, when cooked, are rolled up and cut into strips. They may be dropped into soup before serving.  (dumplings) are small balls made from suet mixed with chopped fried onions, chopped parsley, beaten egg and seasonings, dropped into soup and cooked.

Wine is also an important part of Passover meals. Traditionally, a Passover seder is served with four cups of wine or grape juice, to be consumed along with various parts of the seder. Kosher wine is typically consumed for Passover.

Shavuot
Dairy foods are traditionally eaten on Shavuot.
Blintzes
Cheesecake

Tisha B'Av
Tisha B'av is a fast day, preceded by nine days when Jews traditionally do not eat meat, except on Shabbat. Thus dairy and vegetarian dishes are prepared during this time of year. 

The meal before the fast (the ) also consists of dairy foods and usually contains dishes made from lentils and eggs, both ancient Jewish symbols of mourning. Some Ashkenazi Jews eat hard-boiled eggs sprinkled with ashes to symbolize mourning.

See also

 American Jewish cuisine
 Appetizing store
 Cuisine of Israel
 Cuisine of the Sephardic Jews
 Cuisine of the Mizrahi Jews
 Delicatessen
 Jewish deli
 Hechsher
 Jewish vegetarianism
 Kosher restaurant
 Kosher wine
 List of Jewish cuisine dishes
 List of kosher restaurants

References

Bibliography

Bellin, Mildred Grosberg, The Original Jewish Cook Book, New York, Bloch Publishing, 1983, 
Cooper, John, Eat and Be Satisfied: A Social History of Jewish Food, New Jersey, Jason Aronson Inc., 1993, 
Goldstein, Joyce and Da Costa, Beatriz, Sephardic Flavors: Jewish Cooking of the Mediterranean, Chronicle Books, 2000, 

Marks, Gil, The World of Jewish Cooking: More than 500 Traditional Recipes from Alsace to Yemen, New York, Simon & Schuster, 1996, 

Roden, Claudia, The Book of Jewish Food: An Odyssey from Samarkand to New York, New York, Knopf, 1997, 
Schwartz, Oded, In Search of Plenty: A History of Jewish Food, London, Kyle Cathie Ltd., 1992, 
Sternberg, Robert, The Sephardic Kitchen: The Healthful Food and Rich Culture of the Mediterranean Jews, Harper Collins, 1996,

Historical 
Atrutel, J., Book of Jewish Cookery, London, 1874
Greenbaum, Florence Kreisler, The International Jewish Cookbook, New York, Bloch Publishing, 1919
Kander, Mrs. Simon (Lizzie Black Kander), The Settlement Cookbook, Milwaukee, The Settlement, 1901
Kramer, Bertha M. ("Aunt Babette"), Aunt Babette's Cook Book Cincinnati, Bloch Publishing, 1889
Montefiore, Lady Judith (attr), The Jewish Manual, London, 1846
Aunt Sarah's Cookery Book for a Jewish Kitchen, Liverpool, 1872; 2d ed., 1889

Further reading
Jackson, Judy (1998) Classic Jewish. London: Hermes House  

 
Cuisine by culture
Cuisine by ethnicity
Middle Eastern cuisine